Raúl Torres may refer to:
Raul Torres (singer) (1906–1970), Brazilian singer
Raul Torres (Texas politician) (born 1955), American politician
Raúl Torres (footballer, born 1977), Spanish footballer
Raúl Torres (footballer, born 1996), Mexican footballer

See also
Raúl de la Torre (1938–2010), Argentine director
Raúl Torrez, American politician